Grach may refer to:

MP-443 Grach, a Russian pistol
Sukhoi Su-25, a turbojet powered armored ground support aircraft. 
Foel Grach, a mountain in the Welsh Carneddau
Rafayel Grach, a former Soviet speed skater and Olympic medalist
Chaim Soloveitchik, Rabbi part of the Brisker dynasty.